Victor de Broglie may refer to:

Victor-Maurice, comte de Broglie, (1647–1727), French soldier and general 
Victor-François, 2nd duc de Broglie, (1718–1804), French soldier 
Victor de Broglie (1756–1794), French soldier and politician
Victor de Broglie (1785–1870), 3rd duc de Broglie, French statesman and diplomat 
Victor de Broglie (1846–1906), 5th duc de Broglie, French politician and diplomat
Victor-François de Broglie (born 1949), 8th duc de Broglie, mayor of Broglie, Eure, France

See also
 House of Broglie, for other family members and branches

Broglie, Victor de